Amninderpal Singh Virk, better known as Ammy Virk, is an Indian singer, actor and producer associated with Punjabi Music and subsequently in Punjabi and Hindi films. He started the production house Villagers Film Studio and a distribution company In House Group. He is best known for playing the role of Nikka in Nikka Zaildar series, Shivjit in Qismat & Qismat 2, Harjeet Singh in Harjeeta, and Haakam in Angrej.

He started his acting career with the role of Hakam in the historical romance Punjabi film Angrej (2015) for which he won the Best Debut Actor Award at PTC Punjabi Film Awards. Also, he had starred in other films including Bambukat, Ardaas, Nikka Zaildar, Laung Laachi and Qismat. Gurnaaz Kaur of The Tribune described Virk as Nikka as one of the most loved characters of Punjabi cinema. He is known for his Patiala-Shahi turban. His films Angrej and Qismat are two of the highest grossing Punjabi films of all time. He made his Bollywood debut with film  Bhuj The Pride Of India (2021) directed by Abhishek Dudhaiya.

Early life 
Born as Amninderpal Singh Virk on 11 May 1992 to a Sikh Jatt family in the village of Lohar Majra in Nabha, Patiala. He did a BSc in Biotechnology at the Punjabi University in Patiala. In an interview with The Tribune he said, "It was my mother who told me that I should try singing. I have learned it. I am a singer because of my mother and I love her for having faith in me."  He completed his education in Msc Biotechnology. Virk’s ancestral village is in Sheikhupura district, Pakistan from where his grandfather migrated while 1947 subcontinent partition.

Career

Virk started his film career with Angrej produced by Rhythm Boyz Entertainment and released in 2015. He played the role of Haakam which shows a negative role. Jasmine Singh of The Tribune said, “Angrej is also the ground for singer Ammy Virk, who opens his innings here. If it were just looks, the singer gets a five on five; as far as dialogue delivery goes, there is more work that needs to be done. All the same, he makes his character look and sound real.” Also, he won Best Debut Actor Award at PTC Punjabi Film Awards for his role in the film.

In 2016, his second film Ardaas directed by Gippy Grewal was released. In the film he played the supporting role of Agyapal Singh(Aasi). Divya Pal of News18 said, “It is interesting to see how the film’s supporting actors serve up strong performances. Ammy Virk is suitably striking as Aasi [...]” Uttam of Punjabi Teshan said, “[...] Ammy Virk has improved so much, he acted like a good theatre artist. [...]” Later in July, his film Bambukat was released being his second collaboration with Rhythm Boyz Entertainment. The film was directed by Pankaj Batra and was Virk's first film as a lead Actor. Gurlove Singh of BookMyShow said, "Ammy Virk is a revelation. He has proven that he chooses his scripts carefully. [...] he packs a solid punch in Bambukat. He has definitely grown as an actor. He is exceptional in the emotional scenes. [...] your heart goes out to Channan, and that’s only because of Ammy Virk’s effective portrayal." He won Best Actor Award at PTC Punjabi Film Awards shared with Amrinder Gill for his role of "Channan Singh" in the film and Best Actor Critics Award at Filmfare Awards Punjabi shared with Gurpreet Ghuggi. In September, he starred in Nikka Zaildar as Nikka.

In 2017, he started with playing a special appearance in the Tarsem Jassar's starrer Rabb Da Radio song "Akh Boldi". In May, his thriller film Saab Bahadar  was released. Jasmine Singh of The Tribune, said "Now, it’s time for the Saab Bahadur to come in- Punjabi singer-actor Ammy Virk plays the real cop, the Saab Bahadur in the film [...] he nails it this time too." Gurlove Singh of BookMyShow said, "There’s no denying the fact that Ammy Virk is the heart and soul of Saab Bahadar. He is portraying the titular role and has introduced us to a new brand of a cop with his spellbinding performance. He enacts his character with earnestness and authenticity. He is brilliant in every frame and charges assertively throughout the film. His portrayal of Saab Bahadar stamps the fact that he is one of the most sought-after actors in the Punjabi film industry these days." The film was critically praised but commercially it was not that good.

You can't experiment much. If you make an experimental film in Punjab, then I don't think it will work right now as the market is not that big. If the market grows, then more types of genres like action and suspense can also do well.
-Ammy Virk

In September 2017, his film Nikka Zaildar 2 sequel to Nikka Zaildar was released. The film was set in a bygone era and upon its release was announced HIT by Box Office India. Jasmine Singh of The Tribune said, "Actor-singer Ammy Virk melts into his character, just like he did in Nikka Zaildar. With a line of hits to his credit, Ammy is only growing as an artist. He has banged on comic timing, and the same can be said about his emotional scenes." Later, in December Sat Shri Akaal England was released. In the film, Virk played the role of Major German Singh Mann. The film was not critically and commercially successful but Virk's performance was appreciated. Manjit Singh of Santa Banta said, "Ammy is a natural actor who doesn't require much effort to bring out his best."

In 2018, he started Laung Laachi with a negative supporting role of Ajaypal Singh. The film was written and directed by Amberdeep Singh also starred in the film as a lead Actor. The film was commercially successful and also one of highest grossing Punjabi films of 2018. Later, in May Harjeeta was released. The film was based on Harjeet Singh a hockey player who served as captain for Indian Hockey Team and won World Cup. Jasmine Singh of The Tribune praising his performance said, "It is hard not to notice the actor’s hard work, whether it is adopting the real Tuli’s young looks, his mannerism and his style. Ammy delivers an award winning performance. Ammy has taken to the character like chalk and cheese."

In September, Qismat was released. The film was named after a song sung by himself only because of the similarity in the lead cast, crew and emotions. The film was written and directed by Jagdeep Sidhu. In the film, Virk played the role of Shivjit Singh Gill opposite to Sargun Mehta in the film. Gurlove Singh of BookMyShow said, "Qismat belongs to Ammy Virk and Sargun Mehta. They are the heart and soul of the movie. They both give equally good, well-balanced and superlative performances. You cannot help but fall in love with their on-screen chemistry. They make you smile and cry several times in those two hours. It’s hard to believe anyone else portraying Shivjit and Bani’s roles."
Jasmine Singh of The Tribune also praised the lead cast, saying, “Ammy Virk and Sargun Mehta share strong onscreen chemistry. Ammy makes every word he says achievable in real life. He is one effortless actor who can make the audiences laugh, cry and now, believe in true love.”

In 2019, his films Muklawa and Nikka Zaildar 3 were released. In Muklawa he co-starred with Sonam Bajwa for the third time after Nikka Zaildar and Nikka Zaildar 2. Actress Rose Sardana also starred in Muklawa for the first time with Ammy Virk. In the same year his Chhalle Mundiyaan was released, as was Guddiyan Patole starring Gurnam Bhullar on the other hand produced by him.
 
He is also made his debut in Bollywood with the film 83 directed by Kabir Khan. The film is based on the life of Indian cricket player Kapil Dev. Virk played the role of fast bowler Balwinder Sandhu. He also featured in Bollywood film Bhuj: The Pride of India where he played the role of a fighter pilot. Ammy virk was also featured in Filhaal 2 by B praak.

Filmography 

As a producer
Guddiyan Patole (2019)

Discography

Studio albums

Singles

As Featured Artist

Film soundtrack

Punjabi

Hindi

Awards and nominations

References

External links
 

Indian male singers
Punjabi-language singers
Living people
People from Amritsar district
Male actors in Punjabi cinema
21st-century Indian male actors
Male actors from Punjab, India
Indian male voice actors
Bhangra (music) musicians
1985 births